Operation Matador was a plan of the British Malaya Command to move forces into position in Thailand to counter a Japanese amphibious attack on Malaya.

Background
In 1937, Major-General William Dobbie, Officer Commanding Malaya (1935–1939), looked at Malaya's defences and reported that during the monsoon season, from October to March, landings could be made by an enemy on the east coast and bases could be established in Siam (Thailand). He predicted that landings could be made at Songkhla and Pattani in Siam, and Kota Bharu in Malaya. He recommended large reinforcements to be sent immediately. His predictions turned out to be correct but his recommendations were ignored.

Prelude

In August 1941, the Commander-in-Chief (CinC) of British Far East Command Air Chief Marshal Robert Brooke-Popham submitted a plan, codenamed Matador, to London for approval (PRO record FO 371/28163). The plan relied on the assumption that the Japanese would land on the east coast of Siam at Songkhla and Pattani, then advance south to Jitra and Kroh. It was envisaged that two forces could intercept them just over the border in Thailand, long enough for the main force to assemble and attack. There were several problems with the plan; In January 1941, a request for additional resources that the plan intended to use remained unfulfilled and the previous year Sir Josiah Cosby, the British Ambassador in Siam, signed a non-aggression pact with Luang Phibunsongkhram, the Prime Minister of Siam.

On 5 December 1941, when the threat of Japanese invasion became more likely, the plan was modified to use the forces available. It was to be put into action as soon as an attack was imminent. If an enemy attacked or was invited into Siam, troops under British command would rush to Songkhla and defend it against a seaborne attack. This job was allocated to 11th Infantry Indian Division (Major-General Murray-Lyon) who also had to defend Jitra. These two tasks over-stretched his resources and made his objectives difficult to accomplish.

On 5 December, London gave permission for the C-in-C Far East Command to decide if Operation Matador should be activated. The primary strategic decision to be decided upon, was whether a forestalling move should be launched on Siam before the Japanese landed. Malaya Command was responsible for the detailed planning of Operation Matador and on 6 December 1941 it had reworked the plan and allocated forces for immediate deployment. That evening, in a meeting with the Governor, Sir Shenton Thomas, and the C-in-C Brooke-Popham, the General Officer Commanding Malaya Arthur Percival recommended that such a forestalling attack was premature.

Aftermath
If Matador had been implemented the Japanese had contingency plans to counter a likely British counter-move. They would use the Bangkok airport and the airfields of Southern Siam to establish air superiority and then invade from the Kra Isthmus.

Naval Matador
There was a second Matador plan developed by the Royal Navy to defend Singapore.

See also
 Japanese Invasion of Thailand
 Japanese Invasion of Malaya
 Operation Krohcol – British military response to the Japanese that was carried out instead of Matador

Bibliography

External links
 Report by Percival

British Malaya in World War II
Matador
Military history of Malaya during World War II
Military history of Singapore during World War II
Thailand in World War II
1941 in British Malaya